Christopher David Lee (born 28 March 1947) is an Australian scriptwriter who has been an Australian Associated Press journalist and foreign correspondent and has worked as a script consultant in New Zealand, Singapore and New York City. He has won an AFI Award and four AWGIE Awards and is the recipient of a Centenary Medal and a Queensland Premier's Literary Award.

Early life
Lee is the son of a country doctor and grew up in western New South Wales. He attended Newington College (1962–1964) as a boarder and studied at Sydney University (BA) and the Australian Film Television and Radio School.

Screenwriting
He was the creator and writer of the ABC drama series Stringer, head writer and then script executive of the ABC-BBC drama series  Police Rescue. He wrote four of the six Cody telemovies, and was co-creator and Head Writer of Big Sky. He was an originating writer (with Judi McCrossin) of The Secret Life of Us and co-creator and Head Writer of the short-lived soapie Echo Point. He is the co-creator of the television series Rush. He wrote the SBS teleplay That Man's Father, co-wrote the telemovie, Secret Men's Business (with Nicholas Hammond) and wrote the 4-hour mini-series Do or Die. Most recently, Lee has been the writer of the 2011 mini-series Paper Giants: The Birth of Cleo and the 2012 mini-series Howzat! Kerry Packer's War and the 8-hour mini-series "Gallipoli".

Publishing
He is a short story writer, author of the novel Bush Week published by Angus & Robertson and writer of the book Howzat! Kerry Packer's War published by University of New South Wales Press. In 2015 his novel Seasons of War was published by Penguin Australia.

Lecturer
Lee has lectured in screenwriting at the University of Canberra, the National Institute of Dramatic Art and the Australian Film Television and Radio School.

Awards
His hour of Bodysurfer won an AFI Award and he is a four-time AWGIE Award winner: for the documentary Saturday, Saturday; the mini-series Do or Die; the telemovie pilot for  The Secret Life of Us; and for an episode of Rush which he co-created and script produced. Lee was awarded the Centenary Medal for his contribution to Australian television and won a Queensland Premier's Literary Award in 2011.

References

Australian journalists
Australian television writers
Recipients of the Centenary Medal
People educated at Newington College
1947 births
Living people
Australian male television writers